Colmar-Berg is a commune and town in central Luxembourg, in the canton of Mersch. It is situated at the confluence of the rivers Attert and Alzette.

Colmar-Berg is the site of the Grand Duke of Luxembourg's principal residence, Berg Castle.  It is also the site of a Goodyear tyre factory.

The commune was known as simply "Berg" until 25 March 1991.

The "Centre de Formation pour Conducteurs" (French for "Drivers' Training Centre") is also in Colmar-Berg. Every person has to make an "Obligatory Course" after they got their driving license in order for it to become a definitive license. This has to be done in the timespan after three months and before two years after the person passed their practical driving test.

Population

References

External links
 

 
Towns in Luxembourg
Communes in Mersch (canton)
Alzette